Polpat Asavaprapha, nickname Moo, is a Thai designer, creative director of Asava fashion house, founder of Asava Group and serves as President of the Bangkok Fashion Society. Polpat is also a familiar face on television, well known as a mentor of The Face Men Thailand (season 1) and season 2.

Biography

Early life 
Polpat is luk khrueng, with a Japanese mother and a Thai father. He grew up in a business-oriented family, his family owns car dealerships, Toyota dealer PS Enterprise.

He graduated from Chulalongkorn University, Mass Communication faculty, majoring in Speech Communications and Performing Arts and earned a master's degree from Peter F. Drucker and Masatoshi Ito Graduate School of Management, Claremont Graduate University, fashion design degree from Parsons School of Design in New York and trained with a selection of well-known brands including Giorgio Armani, Maxmara and Marc Jacobs.

Career 
Having studied and worked in New York for almost 10 years, Polpat came back with a dream to pursue a fashion career as a dedicated designer. Since then, he has successfully established his own namesake couture brand, Asava that became locally and internationally recognized.

He is now a Creative Director and founder of Asava Group, which consists of luxury bespoke clothing, Asava, ASV and White Asava, and a restaurant, Sava Dining.

He has also made a name for himself from designing the costumes for Miss Universe Thailand; Aniporn Chalermburanawong, Chalita Suansane, Maria Lynn Ehren and Sophida Kanchanarin.

He also runs his own restaurant, Sava Dining, at EmQuartier and is an executive at the family-owned Toyota dealer PS Enterprise.

Personal life
Polpat is openly homosexual man.

Television 

 The Designer season 2 as judge
The Face Thailand season 3 as guest judge
The Face Men Thailand season 1 as mentor
The Face Thailand season 4 All Stars as guest judge
The Face Men Thailand season 2 as mentor

References

External links 
 
 

Living people
Polpat Asavaprapha
LGBT fashion designers
Polpat Asavaprapha
Polpat Asavaprapha
Polpat Asavaprapha
Polpat Asavaprapha
Polpat Asavaprapha
Claremont Graduate University alumni
Year of birth missing (living people)